United Property & Casualty Insurance Company, Inc. (UPC Insurance) is an American property and casualty insurance company with headquarters in Florida. It writes commercial, residential, homeowners’, and flood insurance policies in several coastal states. According to the most recent data available, UPC Insurance had about 159,170 active policies, accounting for just over 2.5 percent market share.

History

UPC Insurance was founded in 1999 in St. Petersburg, Florida.

In 2012, John Forney was named CEO. Forney is a former U.S. Army infantry officer and graduate of Ranger School. Before joining UPC Insurance, he served in several capacities at Raymond James Financial. 

In 2014, UPC Insurance purchased the AAA Auto South building, which had been owned by the Peninsula Motor Club Inc. since 1987, as its new headquarters. The company tried to acquire Family Security Holdings LLC but never completed the $9 million deal. Also in 2014, Judy Copechal, Chief Underwriting Officer at UPC Insurance, was named as one of the Top 10 Women in Insurance Leadership by Insurance Networking News. 

In 2015, UPC Insurance acquired Interboro Insurance Company, a property and casualty insurance company authorized in New York, Alabama, South Carolina, Washington, D.C., and Louisiana, from Interboro, LLC for $57 million. The company also participated in the Texas Windstorm Insurance Association (TWIA) Depopulation Program. 

In 2017, UPC Insurance merged with American Coastal Insurance Co. Journey Insurance Company offers homeowners and commercial residential property insurance through independent agents and brokers in Florida, South Carolina, and Texas. It received an “A-“ Financial Strength Rating and “a-“ Issuer Credit Rating from A.M. Best. 

In 2018, UPC Insurance announced plans to build another new headquarters in downtown St. Petersburg, the first new office construction in the area since the Duke Energy Florida headquarters in 2007. The company also collaborated with R.J. Kiln & Co., a subsidiary of Tokio Marine Kiln, to form a property and casualty insurance subsidiary called Journey Insurance Company.

In 2019, UPC Insurance reported first-quarter catastrophe losses of $13 million after-tax due to several catastrophic events, including the Brevard County hailstorm, as well as possible loss creep from Hurricane Irma and Hurricane Michael.

Subsidiaries
UPC Insurance has five subsidiaries.

 American Coastal Insurance Company
 Family Security Insurance Company
 Interboro Insurance Company
 Journey Insurance Company
 BlueLine

Services 

 Homeowners Insurance 
 Landlord / Seasonal Property Insurance
 Condominium Insurance
 Flood Insurance
 Commercial Residential Property Insurance
 Renters Insurance

References

Insurance companies of the United States
Insurance companies based in Florida
American companies established in 1999
Financial services companies established in 1999
Financial services companies of the United States
Companies based in Florida
1999 establishments in Florida